Lahcen Daoudi (born 5 January 1947, in Beni Mellal, Morocco) is a Moroccan  politician of the Justice and Development Party. Since 3 January 2012, he holds the position of Minister of "Higher Education and Scientific Research" in Abdelilah Benkirane's government.

See also
Cabinet of Morocco
Justice and Development Party

References

External links
Ministry of Higher Education and Scientific Research (in French)

1947 births
Living people
Alumni of Lycée Descartes (Rabat)
Government ministers of Morocco
Justice and Development Party (Morocco) politicians
Moroccan Berber politicians
People from Beni Mellal